First-seeded Ellsworth Vines defeated fourth-seeded George Lott 7–9, 6–3, 9–7, 7–5 in the final to win the men's singles tennis title at the 1931 U.S. National Championships.

Seeds
The tournament used two lists of eight players for seeding the men's singles event; one for U.S. players and one for foreign players. Fred Perry is the champion; others show the round in which they were eliminated.

  Ellsworth Vines (champion)
  Frank Shields (quarterfinals)
  Sidney Wood (third round)
  George Lott (finalist)
  John Doeg (semifinals)
  Clifford Sutter (fourth round)
  John Van Ryn (quarterfinals)
  Wilmer Allison (second round)

  Fred Perry (semifinals)
  Christian Boussus (fourth round)
  George P. Hughes (third round)
  Jacques Brugnon (second round)
  Jack Wright (first round)
  Marcel Rainville (first round)
  Marcel Bernard (second round)
  Andre Merlin (third round)

Draw

Finals

References

Men's singles
1931